Cheng Yu-cheng (born 12 January 1946) is a Taiwanese politician.

Education
Cheng studied at the National Taipei University of Technology.

Political career
Cheng was raised in what became Xinzhuang District of New Taipei. He began his political career as leader of the area in 1977, before taking a seat on the Legislative Yuan in 1981. He won a second term in 1983, but lost the 1986 elections. Shortly thereafter, Cheng joined the Democratic Progressive Party. He returned to the legislature in 1990 as a DPP representative. Cheng subsequently lost a string of elections until regaining his seat in 2001. In August 2002, Cheng flew to the United States, after he and his legislative aide Sophie Wang had reportedly married in July. He retained former legislative colleague Chiu Chang as his legal representative while seeking a divorce from his wife Lu Pei-ying. However, the divorce was never finalized. Cheng kept his position as a legislator, but left the Democratic Progressive Party in November 2002, days before he was formally expelled. Cheng then became an independent before joining the Non-Partisan Solidarity Union upon its founding in June 2004.

References

1946 births
Living people
New Taipei Members of the Legislative Yuan
Democratic Progressive Party Members of the Legislative Yuan
Non-Partisan Solidarity Union Members of the Legislative Yuan
Members of the 1st Legislative Yuan in Taiwan
Members of the 5th Legislative Yuan
National Taipei University of Technology alumni
Expelled members of the Democratic Progressive Party (Taiwan)
Mayors of places in Taiwan